T.  R. Ōtsuka  (1868 – ?) was a Japanese garden builder. After emigrating from Japan to the United States in 1897 and moving to Chicago around 1905, he built dozens of Japanese-style gardens and rock gardens, mostly in the Midwest, between 1905 and the mid-1930s. His most notable projects were the Japanese-style garden of George and Nelle Fabyan in Geneva, Illinois; the Japanese Garden at Stan Hywet in Akron, Ohio (1916); the garden of Milton Tootle, Jr. in Mackinac Island, Michigan (before 1910); and the official Japanese pavilion garden at the 1933–1934 Century of Progress Exposition in Chicago, Illinois.

Early life in Japan 
Tarō Ōtsuka was born in 1868 in the city of Kōchi in Kōchi Prefecture, on the island of Shikoku, Japan. According to his 1897 passport record, his father was Katsunobu Ōtsuka—this was his formal samurai name; his everyday name was Shōsaburō Ōtsuka—a high-ranked Tosa Domain samurai retainer until the Meiji Restoration, which occurred in the year of Tarō Ōtsuka's birth. Also, a 1924 Nichibei Jihō article mentions that "…Tarō Ōtsuka was a Tosa Clan samurai." Additionally, his connections with several other high-ranked former samurai-class residents of Kōchi—journalist Kayano Nagatomo, who was a Japanese supporter of Sun Yat-sen and was likely Ōtsuka's cousin; politician Kenkichi Kataoka; and politician Gotō Shōjirō—make it likely his family was also of similar rank. Kayano’s father went into the mining business with a relative named Ōtsuka, who may have been Tarō Ōtsuka’s father.

Ōtsuka did not apprentice as a gardener in Japan, according to landscape professor Keiji Uehara, who met him when visiting the United States around 1921 to document overseas Japanese-style garden work:

Uehara also writes in the same book that "Tarō Ōtsuka...built many unique Japanese gardens in the central region of the United States. But he was self-taught."

He likely did some of his early garden work in Japan, as an advertisement he placed in the April 1917 issue of Country Life claimed that Japanese and rock gardens were "My specialty for thirty years", implying that he had begun building gardens by 1887, ten years before he emigrated to the United States.

Ōtsuka was married to Yoneko Kamura by 1897. They did not have any children, according to the 1920 US census.

Life and work in America 
Ōtsuka emigrated to the United States in 1897. He arrived in the Port of Seattle, Washington from Kobe, Japan aboard the Kamakura Maru on December 21, 1897, and settled in Tacoma, Washington. After several years working in Tacoma, he brought his wife to the US in July 1900. They moved to Chicago around 1905, perhaps after attending the 1904 World’s Fair in St. Louis.

Ōtsuka likely began building rock gardens and Japanese-style gardens in the Chicago area soon after 1905, based on the date of his known and probable projects. During his career, Ōtsuka built numerous gardens in the Midwestern states, Florida, and upstate New York. As T. R. Ōtsuka, he advertised widely between 1911 and the early 1930s in national magazines including Country Life, House Beautiful, and The Garden.Clay Lancaster comments on Ōtsuka:

From 1911 to 1916, Ōtsuka's garden business address was in the Fine Arts Building at 414 South Michigan Avenue across from Grant Park in Chicago.

From before 1910 to around 1930, Ōtsuka was associated with the D. Hill Nursery Company of Dundee, IL. The nursery, one of the oldest and largest suppliers of evergreen trees and shrubs in Illinois, included testimonials about Ōtsuka's skills in building rock gardens and Japanese-style gardens in its catalogs, and in return, Ōtsuka likely sourced the evergreens he used in his gardens from its nursery.

Beginning in the early 1920s, the Ōtsukas began spending winters in Yamato, Florida (a Japanese community near Miami), and they moved to New York City in late March 1924.

The Japanese government commissioned Ōtsuka to build the gardens around their official pavilion buildings at the Century of Progress Exposition in 1933. Prof. Kendall H. Brown states that "The Japanese pavilion featured a teahouse with small tea garden and the main pavilion with entry garden built by Tarō Ōtsuka, a Japanese living in Chicago who had constructed gardens throughout the midwest."

When and where Ōtsuka died is not known. His wife died on February 19, 1937, in Miami, Florida. Uehara writes, "After his wife's death, Mr. Ōtsuka returned to Japan alone and later went to China, but his whereabouts disappeared afterward."

List of works 

Documented garden projects in the United States (Japanese-style gardens unless otherwise noted, *asterisked projects are documented by inclusion in Ōtsuka's brochure, see below):

 : Milton Tootle Garden, Mackinac Island, MI*
 c.1910: Fabyan Japanese Garden, Geneva, IL*
 c.1912: Mrs. L. F. Swift Garden, Lake Forest, IL*
 1912: Hinata, Mrs. Clarence LeBus Garden, Lexington, KY*
 1914: E. L. King Garden, Homer, Winona County, MN*
 c.1915: Mrs. Edward Morris Garden, Chicago, IL*
 c.1915: Harry M. Jones Garden, Western Springs, IL
 c.1915: R. D. Forgan Alpine Rock Garden, Highland Park, IL
 1915: Higinbotham Japanese Garden, Joliet, IL*
 1916: Stan Hywet Japanese Garden, Akron, OH*
 c.1917: Morton Japanese Garden, Lisle, IL*
 1918: Laura Bradley Park Japanese Garden, Peoria, IL*
 c.1920: French Lick Springs Hotel Japanese Garden, IN
 c.1920: Holcomb Garden, Indianapolis, IN
 c.1920: David Hill Rock Garden Pond, Dundee, IL
 1923: Woman’s Benefit Association Summer Camp, Lake Huron, MI
 1927: Henry County Memorial Park, New Castle, IN
 1933: Official Japanese Pavilion Garden, Century of Progress International Exposition, Chicago, IL
It is probable that Ōtsuka also built numerous rock gardens in varying styles in the Midwest, as he specifically advertised his skills in rock garden construction between 1915 and 1930.

Photographs of garden work

Garden brochure, c.1919 
A single surviving photocopy of a five-fold brochure published by Ōtsuka around 1919 is the most important surviving record of his work. The brochure details Ōtsuka’s experience and the history and philosophy of Japanese gardens. A portrait of him is included, as well as small photos of nine private Japanese-style gardens and one public park garden (most of the gardens are confirmed to be his work through other sources):

 Mr. Milton Tootle, Mackinac Island, Michigan
 Mrs. George Fabyan, Geneva, Illinois
 Mr. F. A. Seiberling, Akron, Ohio
 Mr. Joy Morton, Lisle, Illinois
 Mr. H. D. Higinbotham, Joliet, Illinois
 Bradley Park, Peoria, Illinois
 Mrs. Clarence LeBus, Lexington, Kentucky
 Mrs. Edward Morris, Chicago, Illinois
 Mr. E. L. King, Winona, Minnesota
 Mrs. L. F. Swift, Lake Forest, Illinois

The brochure was published between 1916 and 1921, including the 300 South Michigan Avenue address, where Ōtsuka's garden business mailing address during that period. The Laura Bradley Park garden was built in 1918 and was pictured in the brochure. It was most likely printed around 1919 or at the end of World War I.

References

1868 births
Japanese expatriates in the United States
Japanese gardeners
American landscape and garden designers
People from Chicago
People from Kōchi, Kōchi
People from New York City
Year of death missing